Bukwo General Hospital, also Bukwo District Hospital or Bukwo Hospital, is a hospital in the Eastern Region of Uganda.

Location
The coordinates of Bukwo Hospital are 1°17'39.0"N, 34°45'19.0"E (Latitude:1.294158; Longitude:34.755286).

Overview
Bukwo General Hospital is a public hospital, funded by the Uganda Ministry of Health and general care in the hospital is free. The hospital was built in the 2000s, with laying of the foundation stone in June 2010. The hospital is plagued by lack of electricity, and understaffing.

Renovations
In 2013, the government of Uganda, secured a loan from the World Bank to renovate certain Ugandan hospitals, including this hospital. The specific renovations planned include the following:
1. Construction of a new T-Block building 2. Construction of a new Outpatient department 3. Construction of an Emergency room (Casualty department) 4. Construction of new Administrative offices 5. Construction of a house to accommodate the diesel generator 6. Construction of a placenta disposal facility 7. Construction of a medical waste disposal facility 8. Construction of six new staff houses 9. Construction of a laundry for the benefit of patient attendants 10. Construction of a kitchen and dining room for patient attendants 11. Construction of a new incinerator 12. Construction of ventilated, improved pit latrines for use by patient attendants and outpatients.

See also
 List of hospitals in Uganda

References

External links
 Website of Uganda Ministry of Health

Hospitals in Uganda
Hospitals established in 2010
Bukwo District
Eastern Region, Uganda
2010 establishments in Uganda